Almonda (also spelled Almanda or Alamanda) is a village in Koraput district, Odisha, India. As of the 2011 Census of India, it had a population of 2,178 across 565 households, with 1,095 males and 1,083 females. 1,073 residents were literate, and 292 were six years old or younger.

References

Villages in Koraput district